William Lambert Fowles (1842 - 18 August 1880) was a politician in Queensland, Australia, successfully winning the seat of Clermont in 1878. He was a Member of the Queensland Legislative Assembly.

Early life 
Fowles was born in 1842 in Kent, England, and emigrated with his family in 1849. He became an articled clerk with Charles Lilley (and later James Garrick) and was admitted as a solicitor in 1865.

Career 
From 1865 to 1869 he practised in partnership with Thomas Keane. In 1869, he became the Registrar of the Supreme Court of Queensland, but resigned this position upon the death of Thomas Keane to take over the law practice. Fowles would practise as a solicitor in Clermont, Queensland from 1873. He also took a part interest in the Peak Downs Telegram and was editor of it. After standing as a Liberal candidate and winning the seat of Clermont in 1878, changes occurred within the party and before he could take his seat in the chamber, he again took the position of the Registrar of the Supreme Court of Queensland in 1879. He would hold this position until his death in 1880.

Later life 
Fowles died at his home and was survived by his wife and five children. His funeral proceeded from his former residence at South Brisbane to the Toowong Cemetery.

References

Members of the Queensland Legislative Assembly
1842 births
1880 deaths
19th-century Australian politicians